Strategic Grill Locations is a comedy album from Mitch Hedberg. It is a recording of a performance at The Laff Stop comedy club in Houston, Texas, on September 7, 1999. The album was originally self-published by Hedberg and sold through his website and at shows. In conjunction with the release of his second album, Mitch All Together, the Comedy Central label also re-released this album, editing out some jokes that did not get much reaction. This re-release was packaged in a digipack. The original release featured a different cover.

Like Mitch All Together, the title Strategic Grill Locations is taken from a joke that does not actually appear on the album:

Strategic Grill Locations contains 21 tracks of mostly one-liners. Tracks contain a series of both related and unrelated jokes, and are named for one of them. Hedberg's performance is accompanied by Chuck Savage on double bass.

Track listing
"The CD Jokes" - 2:36
"Koalas" - 3:08
"Highlights" - 2:08
"You Were Good" - 2:00
"Shaving Too" - 2:12
"Minibar" - 2:58
"Beret and Pancakes" - 1:49
"The Velcro Wallet" - 2:41
"Dry Clean Only" - 1:27
"Gambling" - 2:25
"My Necklace" - 2:45
"Acting" - 2:59
"Lynn" - 2:45
"Tomatoes" - 2:39
"Six People Isn't Convincing" - 2:55
"Cookies" - 3:13
"Oatmeal" - 2:44
"Smackie the Frog" - 2:50
"Frogs and Bears" - 3:00
"Fire Exit" - 3:12
"The Dufrenes" - 1:21

References

Mitch Hedberg albums
1999 debut albums
1999 live albums
Comedy Central Records live albums
Stand-up comedy albums
1990s comedy albums
Live comedy albums
Spoken word albums by American artists
Live spoken word albums